Tatsiana Valerevna Sharakova (born 31 July 1984) is a Belarusian racing cyclist, who rides for Belarusian amateur team . She competed at the 2012 Summer Olympics on the track in the women's team pursuit for the national team.

Doping 
Sharakova tested positive for Tuaminoheptane at the 2012 UEC European Track Championships and received an 18-month doping suspension.

Major results

Road
Source: 

2002
 9th Tour de Berne
2003
 2nd Road race, National Road Championships
2004
 2nd Road race, National Road Championships
 10th Gran Premio Brissago Lago Maggiore
2005
 National Road Championships
1st  Road race
1st  Time trial
2006
 3rd Overall Grande Boucle Féminine Internationale
1st Young rider classification
2007
 National Road Championships
1st  Road race
1st  Time trial
2008
 National Road Championships
1st  Road race
1st  Time trial
 4th Overall Tour de Bretagne Féminin
1st Stage 4b
2009
 National Road Championships
1st  Road race
1st  Time trial
2011
 National Road Championships
2nd Road race
2nd Time trial
2012
 1st  Road race, National Road Championships
2015
 National Road Championships
2nd Road race
2nd Time trial
2016
 National Road Championships
1st  Road race
1st  Time trial
2017
 National Road Championships
1st  Road race
1st  Time trial
 4th VR Women ITT
 8th Overall Tour of Zhoushan Island
2019
 National Road Championships
1st  Road race
1st  Time trial
 1st Grand Prix Alanya
 1st Grand Prix Justiniano Hotels
 European Games
3rd  Road race
10th Time trial
 5th VR Women ITT
 7th Overall Tour of Chongming Island
2020
 National Road Championships
1st  Road race
1st  Time trial
 2nd Overall Dubai Women's Tour
1st Stage 3
 5th Grand Prix Alanya
2021
 National Road Championships
1st  Road race
1st  Time trial
 1st Grand Prix Velo Manavgat

Track

2004
 UEC European Under-23 Track Championships
2nd  Individual pursuit
3rd  Points race
2005
 1st  Individual pursuit, UEC European Under-23 Track Championships
 3rd  Individual pursuit, 2004–05 UCI Track Cycling World Cup Classics, Sydney
2006
 UEC European Under-23 Track Championships
1st  Individual pursuit
3rd  Scratch
2009
 1st  Scratch, 2009–10 UCI Track Cycling World Cup Classics, Cali
2010
 2nd  Omnium, UEC European Track Championships
 3rd  Points race, UCI Track World Championships
 3rd  Omnium, 2010–11 UCI Track Cycling World Cup Classics, Cali
2011
 1st  Points race, UCI Track World Championships
 UEC European Track Championships
2nd  Omnium
3rd  Team pursuit
2012
 2nd  Team pursuit, 2011–12 UCI Track Cycling World Cup, Beijing
 3rd  Team pursuit, UEC European Track Championships
 3rd  Team pursuit, 2012–13 UCI Track Cycling World Cup, Glasgow
2014
 1st Omnium, Grand Prix Minsk
 2nd Omnium, GP Prostejov – Memorial of Otmar Malecek
 3rd Omnium, Cottbuser Nächte
2015
 Panevėžys
1st Individual pursuit
1st Omnium
 1st Omnium, Grand Prix Minsk
2016
 1st Omnium, Grand Prix Minsk
 Memorial of Alexander Lesnikov
1st Scratch
3rd Points race
 2016–17 UCI Track Cycling World Cup, Glasgow
 3rd  Individual pursuit
 3rd  Omnium
2017
 2nd Points race, Grand Prix Minsk
 2nd Omnium, International track race – Panevežys
 3rd  Points race, UEC European Track Championships
2019
 1st  Individual pursuit, European Games
 UEC European Track Championships
2nd  Points race
3rd  Omnium
 3rd  Points race, 2019–20 UCI Track Cycling World Cup, Minsk
2020
 National Track Championships
1st  Madison (with Nastassia Kiptsikava)
1st  Omnium

References

External links

1984 births
Living people
Doping cases in cycling
Belarusian sportspeople in doping cases
Belarusian female cyclists
UCI Track Cycling World Champions (women)
People from Orsha
Cyclists at the 2012 Summer Olympics
Cyclists at the 2016 Summer Olympics
Olympic cyclists of Belarus
Cyclists at the 2015 European Games
Belarusian track cyclists
Cyclists at the 2019 European Games
European Games medalists in cycling
European Games bronze medalists for Belarus
European Games gold medalists for Belarus
Cyclists at the 2020 Summer Olympics
Sportspeople from Vitebsk Region